The Warner Robins, Georgia metropolitan statistical area currently includes Houston and Peach counties in central Georgia. In addition to the principal city of Warner Robins, the MSA also includes the incorporated municipalities of Centerville and Perry in Houston County along with Byron and Fort Valley in Peach County. From 2013 to 2018, the MSA also included Hawkinsville and Pulaski County.

The Warner Robins MSA is a component of the larger Macon-Warner Robins-Fort Valley Combined Statistical Area.

According to the 2010 Census, the MSA's total population (using the current boundaries) was 167,595; as of July 1, 2019, the total population of the MSA was estimated to be 185,409. About 80% of the MSA population is concentrated in Houston County, which has become increasingly urbanized since the establishment of the city of Warner Robins and Robins Air Force Base during World War II, while Peach County remains predominantly rural in character.

 
Metropolitan statistical areas of the United States